Freedom of '76 is an EP by Ween released in 1994 by Flying Nun Records. The title song was originally featured on Ween's album Chocolate and Cheese. A music video for the track was directed by Spike Jonze. It depicts Ween (Gene and Dean) attempting to steal the Liberty Bell only to be caught, arrested, and sentenced by the authorities. A real event occurred at Independence Hall, where the video crew filmed the night before. A prop hand grenade was left from the shoot only to be discovered by a young tourist the next day.

References to Philadelphia
The song makes various references to Philadelphia such as:
South Street
 Bacon Steak (A Philadelphia-specific favorite sandwich)
The Liberty Bell
The film Mannequin being filmed in Philadelphia's Woolworth's (although the film was actually shot at Wanamaker's)
Boyz II Men (whose hometown is Philadelphia)
Fairmount Park
Boathouse Row

Track listing
CD
"Freedom of '76"
"Freedom of '76" (Shaved Dog mix)
"Now I'm Freaking Out"
"Pollo Asado"

7-inch EP
"Freedom of '76"
"Freedom of '76" (Shaved Dog mix)
"Bakersfield"

7-inch picture disc
"Freedom of '76"
"Pollo Asado"

Personnel
Dean Weenguitar
Gene Weenguitar, vocals
Andrew Weissproducer
Track 2 engineered by Mario Caldato Jr. and mixed by Mike D at Bundy's Playhouse
Track 4 originally from The Pod

References

1994 EPs
Flying Nun Records EPs
Ween EPs
Songs about Pennsylvania